STW or StW may refer to:

Business
 Scott Tallon Walker Architects
 Stop the War Coalition, an anti-war group in the United Kingdom

Mathematics
 The Shimura-Taniyama-Weil conjecture, a generalization of Fermat's Last Theorem.

Music
 Salt the Wound, a deathcore band
 Silence the World, third album by the Swedish band Adept

Television
 KSTW, a television station
 Secrets of a Teenage Witch, a 3D animated series
 STW-9, a television station in Perth, Australia
 Scott the Woz, a web comedy review series

Utility companies
 Severn Trent Water
 Sewage treatment, Sewage Treatment Works

Transport
 MTR station code for Sha Tin Wai station, Hong Kong
 National Rail station code for Strawberry Hill railway station, London, England

Other
 Fortnite: Save the World, a survival game
 Search The Web, a milder version of computer jargon acronym STFW
 Shogun: Total War, a PC strategy game.
 Speed through water, nautical term
 Sport Touring Wagon, an alternative marketing name for Crossover (automobile) style vehicles.
 IATA code for Stavropol Shpakovskoye Airport
 Super Tourenwagen Cup, the German Supertouring car championship (until 1999)
 Surviving the World, a daily webcomic.
 "Stop the world", a global pause in a computer program for garbage collection.
 ScrewTurn Wiki, software